Fuente Carreteros is a municipality located in the Province of Córdoba, in the autonomous community of Andalusia, Spain.

References

Municipalities in the Province of Córdoba (Spain)